Taare Zameen Par, later reissued as Like Stars on Earth for Disney's international edition DVD, is a 2007 Indian drama film directed by Aamir Khan. Creative Director and writer Amole Gupte initially developed the idea with his wife Deepa Bhatia, who served as the film's editor. Visual effects were created by Tata Elxsi's Visual Computing Labs, and the title animation—the first use of claymation in a Bollywood film—was created by Dhimant Vyas. Shankar–Ehsaan–Loy composed the film's score, and Prasoon Joshi wrote the lyrics for many of the songs. Principal photography took place in Mumbai and in Panchgani's New Era High School, and some of the school's students make appearances.

Walt Disney Company Home Entertainment, which acquired 33 percent of UTV Software Communications, bought the DVD rights for distribution in North America, the United Kingdom, and Australia for  7 crore (US$1.68 million). This marked "the first time an international studio has bought the video rights of an Indian film." Disney released the film in Region 2 on 26 October 2009, in Region 1 on 12 January 2010, and in Region 4 on 29 March 2010. A three-disc set, the Disney version features the original Hindi audio soundtrack with English subtitles or another dubbed in English, as well as bonus material such as audio commentary, deleted scenes, and the musical soundtrack.

Accolades
 55th National Film Awards
 Won – Best Film on Family Welfare – Aamir Khan
 Won – Best Lyricist – Prasoon Joshi for "Maa"
 Won – Best Male Playback Singer – Shankar Mahadevan for "Maa"

2008 Filmfare Awards
 Won – Best Film – Aamir Khan
 Won – Best Director – Aamir Khan
 Won – Best Actor (Critics) – Darsheel Safary
 Won – Best Lyricist – Prasoon Joshi for "Maa"
 Won – Best Story – Amole Gupte

2008 Zee Cine Awards
 Won – Best Director – Aamir Khan
 Won – Best Actor (Critics) – Darsheel Safary
 Won – Best Lyricist – Prasoon Joshi for "Maa"
 Won – Most Promising Director – Aamir Khan
 Won – Most Promising Debut (Child Artiste) – Darsheel Safary
 Won – Best Story – Amole Gupte

2009 Producers Guild Film Awards
Won – Best Film – Aamir Khan
Won – Best Director – Aamir Khan
Won – Best Lyricist – Prasoon Joshi for "Maa"
Won – Best Male Playback Singer – Shankar Mahadevan for "Maa"
Won – Best Story – Amole Gupte
Won – Best Screenplay – Amole Gupte
Won – Best Special Effects – Vaibhav Kumaresh, Dhimant Vyas

2008 Star Screen Awards
 Won – Best Director – Aamir Khan (shared with Shimit Amin for Chak De India)
 Won – Best Supporting Actor – Aamir Khan
 Won – Best Child Artist – Darsheel Safary
 Won – Best Lyricist – Prasoon Joshi for "Maa"
 Won – Best Story – Amole Gupte
 Won – Best Dialogue – Amole Gupte

2008 V. Shantaram Awards
 Won – Best Film (Gold)
 Won – Best Director (Silver) – Aamir Khan
 Won – Best Actor – Darsheel Safary
 Won – Best Writer – Amole Gupte

2008 Gollapudi Srinivas Award
Won – Best First Film for a Director – Aamir Khan

2009 List of submissions to the 81st Academy Awards for Best Foreign Language Film

Taare Zameen Par was initially acclaimed as India's official entry for the 2009 Academy Awards Best Foreign Film, but after it failed to make the short list a debate began in the Indian media as to why Indian films never win Oscars.

Notes

External links
 Official Website
Official Disney site

Taare Zameen Par